William Ruffner Middle School may refer to:

W.H. Ruffner Academy in Norfolk, Virginia
William Ruffner Middle School (Roanoke, Virginia), located in the Miller Court/Arrowood neighborhood